Al-Ittihad Club or simply Ittihad Nablus is a Palestinian football team from the city of Nablus that participates in the West Bank Second League. They use the stadium of Nablus.

History
The club was founded in 1932 in the city of Nablus. Its activity was interrupted for long periods of time due to the conditions that prevailed in Palestine during the British Mandate and because of the Nakba. Activity was renewed on 05/25/1962 AD, when the new founding body of the Al-Ittihad Sports Club held an official first session after the Nakba in Al-Mansheya Park in Nablus to restore sports and cultural activity.

The aim of the establishment was to consider it as a national institution capable of bearing the burdens of the stage to devote social, cultural, sports and scout work on the ground and be a beacon for all the people of the city and even the governorate to guide them, give it from their effort and belonging and give them the spirit of purposeful collective action a spark of hope for a prosperous future armed with the spirit of education.

The club has developed through the years of its tender and became the first address for all activities in sports, culture, scouting and socially. Its committees were active in all fields . The club formed a meeting point for all the city’s residents, Muslims and Christians until the Israeli occupation in 1948, and activities in the club stopped until 1952, when activities were restarted.

In 1962 AD, on 5-25-1962 AD, the founding body of the Al-Ittihad Sports Club held a first session in Al-Mansheya Park in Nablus, and the club at that time had a strong activity in most sports such as football, basketball, handball, table tennis, athletics, wrestling and boxing 

A preparatory committee was elected in order to restore the club’s activities and a new administrative body was elected. This was done on 7/15/1967.

References

External links

Football clubs in the West Bank
Association football clubs established in 1932
1932 establishments in Mandatory Palestine
Nablus